Yumi is the Japanese word for a bow (weapon).

Yumi may also refer to:

Yumi (name), a feminine Japanese and Korean given name
Yumi, Yumi, Yumi, national anthem of Vanuatu

See also
 Yummy (disambiguation)